GPP may refer to:

Places 
 Grosse Pointe Park, Michigan, United States

Politics 
 Gambian People's Party, Gambia
 German People's Party, a political party in Germany dissolved in 1933
 German People's Party (1868), a political party in Germany from 1868 to 1910
 German People's Party (Austria), a former political party in Austria
 German People's Party (Romania), a former political party in Romania
 Great Patriotic Pole, a Venezuelan political alliance
 Goa Praja Party, Goa, India
 Gujarat Parivartan Party, Gujarat, India

Science and technology

Biology and medicine 
 General physical preparedness
 Generalized pustular psoriasis
 Gross Primary Productivity
 Gpp protein, which converts pppGpp to ppGpp during the stringent response

Chemistry 
 Geranyl pyrophosphate

Computing and telecommunications 
 3GPP, a collaboration between telecommunications associations
 GeForce Partner Program
 General purpose preprocessor
 Genuine People Personalities (Douglas Adams' Marvin the Paranoid Android)
  Google Play Protect

Economics 
 Gross Private Product, a means of national income accounting
 Gross Provincial Product, a means of measuring national income in Thailand

Transport
 Gradski prijevoz putnika, a bus and tram company in Osijek

Other uses 
Green public procurement
 Global Poverty Project
 Government Polytechnic, Panaji, India